Silvan Dominic Widmer (born 5 March 1993) is a Swiss professional footballer who plays as a right-back for Bundesliga club Mainz 05 and the Switzerland national team.

Club career
Widmer began his playing career at SV Würenlos and FC Baden before he moved on to FC Aarau where he rose through their youth ranks, soon playing regularly for Aarau's reserve team. He eventually made his league debut on 23 July 2011 against FC Winterthur, starting the match. He scored his first Swiss Challenge League goal in a 2–2 home draw against FC St. Gallen on 21 November 2011.

He signed with Udinese in the summer of 2012, but remained at Aarau for the 2012–13 season.

On 12 July 2018, Widmer signed with Basel for a club record €5.5 million.

Under trainer Marcel Koller Basel won the Swiss Cup in the 2018–19 season. In the first round Basel beat FC Montlingen 3–0, in the second round Echallens Région 7–2 and in the round of 16 Winterthur 1–0. In the quarter finals Sion were defeated 4–2 after extra time and in the semi finals Zürich were defeated 3–1. All these games were played away from home. The final was held on 19 May 2019 in the Stade de Suisse Wankdorf Bern against Thun. Striker Albian Ajeti scored the first goal, Fabian Frei the second for Basel, then Dejan Sorgić netted a goal for Thun, but the end result was 2–1 for Basel. Widmer played in five cup games and scored one goal, this being the winning goal in the match against Winterthur.

Widmer moved to Bundesliga club 1. FSV Mainz 05 in July 2021, having agreed a three-year contract.

International career
Widmer was a Switzerland youth international having played both at under-19 and under-21 level.

He made his debut for the senior national squad on 12 October 2014 in a UEFA Euro 2016 qualifying Group E game against San Marino as a 59th-minute substitute for Stephan Lichtsteiner.

Widmer scored his first international goal for Switzerland on 6 September 2020, in a 1–1 UEFA Nations League draw against Germany.

In 2021 he was called up to the national team for the 2020 UEFA European Championship.

International goals

References

External links

 Profile at the 1. FSV Mainz 05 website 
 Career history at SFV
 

Living people
1993 births
People from Aarau
Association football defenders
Swiss men's footballers
Switzerland international footballers
Switzerland youth international footballers
Switzerland under-21 international footballers
UEFA Euro 2020 players
2022 FIFA World Cup players
FC Aarau players
Granada CF footballers
Udinese Calcio players
FC Basel players
1. FSV Mainz 05 players
Swiss Super League players
Swiss Challenge League players
Serie A players
Swiss expatriate footballers
Swiss expatriate sportspeople in Italy
Expatriate footballers in Italy
Swiss expatriate sportspeople in Germany
Expatriate footballers in Germany
Sportspeople from Aargau